

November 2020

See also

References 

killings by law enforcement officers
 11